The Chinese mountain cat (Felis bieti), also known as Chinese desert cat and Chinese steppe cat, is a small wild cat endemic to western China that has been listed as Vulnerable on the IUCN Red List since 2002, as the effective population size may be fewer than 10,000 mature breeding individuals.

It was provisionally classified as a wildcat subspecies with the name F. silvestris bieti in 2007.
It is recognised as a valid species since 2017, as it is morphologically distinct from wildcats.

Taxonomy
The scientific name Felis bieti was proposed by Alphonse Milne-Edwards in 1892 who described the Chinese mountain cat based on a skin collected in Sichuan Province. He named it Felis Bieti after the French missionary Félix Biet.

Some authorities consider the chutuchta and vellerosa subspecies of the wildcat as Chinese mountain cat subspecies.

Characteristics
The Chinese mountain cat has sand-coloured fur with dark guard hairs. Faint dark horizontal stripes on the face and legs are hardly visible. Its ears have black tips. It has a relatively broad skull, and long hair growing between the pads of their feet. It is whitish on the belly, and its legs and tail bear black rings. The tip of the tail is black.

Distribution and habitat
The Chinese mountain cat is endemic to China and lives on the north-eastern edge of the Tibetan Plateau. It was recorded only in eastern Qinghai and north-western Sichuan.
It inhabits high-elevation steppe grassland, alpine meadow, alpine shrubland and coniferous forest edges between  elevation. It has not been confirmed in true desert or heavily forested mountains.

The first photographs of a wild Chinese mountain cat were taken by camera traps during light snow in May 2007 at  elevation in Sichuan. These photographs were taken in rolling grasslands and brush-covered mountains. One individual was observed and photographed in May 2015 in the Ruoergai grasslands. Between autumn 2018 and spring 2019, Chinese mountain cats were documented in an alpine meadow in the southeastern Sanjiangyuan region.

Ecology and behaviour 
The Chinese mountain cat is active at night and preys on pikas, rodents and birds. It breeds between January and March. Females give birth to two to four kittens in a secluded burrow.

Until 2007, the Chinese mountain cat was known only from six individuals, all living in Chinese zoos, and a few skins in museums.

Threats 
The Chinese mountain cat is threatened due to the organised poisoning of pikas. The poison used diminishes prey species and also kills cats unintentionally.

Conservation 
Felis bieti is listed on CITES Appendix II. It is protected in China by laws such as the Animal Protection Law and the Forestry Law. Since February 2021, it is included in the National First-Class Protected Animals under the Law of the People’s Republic on the Conservation of Wild Animals.

See also
List of endangered and protected species of China

References

External links

Chinese Mountain Cat
Mammals described in 1892
Endemic fauna of China
Mammals of China